Content is the information contained within communication media. This includes internet, cinema, television, radio, audio CDs, books, magazines, physical art, and live event content. It’s directed at an end-user or audience in the sectors of publishing, art, and communication.  Live events include speeches, conferences, and stage performances. Content within media focuses on the attention and how receptive the audience is to the content. Circulation brings the content to everyone and helps spread it to reach large audiences. It is a process in which anyone who encounters any type of content will go through a cycle where they encounter the content, interpret it, and will continue to share it with other people. 

The advent of the Information Age has led to the advancement of content as a mass-produced commodity for distribution through avenues such as the Internet (and more specifically social media) and the professionalisation of content creation.

Any content developed or disseminated by an individual or on one's behalf, including but not limited to content distributed via books, magazines, brochures, newsletters, newspapers, social media, billboards, websites, mobile applications, movies, television, and radio, is referenced to as media content.

Content value
Content is "something [...] expressed through some medium, as speech, writing or any of various arts." A main aspect of content is the medium (from Latin medium, "means, surface") which consists in the infrastructure, surface, and system in which a message is disseminated. However, the medium provides little to no value to the end-user without the information and experiences that make up the content. Communication theory philosopher Marshall McLuhan coined the phrase "The medium is the message." The phrase highlights how the means used to communicate a message (the medium) have a bearing on the way the message itself will be interpreted, and provide important contextual information.

Content notably distinguishes itself by its memetic property, wherein users replicate and adapt content for retransmission. The author, producer or publisher of a source of information and experiences may directly be responsible for the entire value they establish as content. Users develop their own, "new" content in media featuring user innovation. Much of social media content is derived this way, by effectively re-cycling content in a slightly different format. The increased rate at which information is exchanged over the Internet compared to traditional analog media, as well as the ability to broadcast one's own media, leads to the development of meme content online. Social media platforms give users the space for storage and provide tools to create content. It includes platforms that give users a space for storage and provide plenty of tools to promote, organize and advertise their thoughts.

Technological advancements 
Traditionally, content is edited and tailored to the public through news editors, authors, and content creators. However, not all information content requires creative authoring or editing. Content is not a product of reputable sources only; the advent of self-broadcasting thanks to information technology has led to a proliferation of primary sources and the dissemination of misinformation in the form of shareable content designed to maximise engagement and exposure. 

Media production and delivery technology may potentially enhance the value by formatting, filtering, and combining different types of content for new audiences. Less emphasis on value from content stored for possible use in its original form and more emphasis on rapid re-purposing, reuse, and redeployment has led many publishers and media producers to view their primary function less as originators and more as transformers of content. Thus, one finds out that institutions that used to focus on publishing printed materials are now publishing both databases and software to combine content from various sources for a wider variety of audiences.

The process through which content is processed by Internet infrastructure before being "delivered" to users is the content delivery network, and notably involves selection and curation using specific algorithms designed to create an addictive and engaging stream of content. This has led to the development of problematic social media use and of various closed circuits in the production and consumption of user-generated content, leading to self-reinforcement of political and other biases and the evolution of echo chambers.

Content regulation

The transmission of content and intellectual property have attracted attention and regulation from authorities worldwide, due to the memetic nature and possible social impact of content sharing. The regulation of content may take the form of selective censorship of works and content most often featuring obscenity, violence, or dissent, with wide variation through time and geographical situation concerning the bounds of legal content transmission. Content regulation also concerns the rules regarding transmission of the content itself. Regulations on content vary, and may come into conflict with each other more often in the context of global information exchange via the Internet.

Restrictions that vary between jurisdictions exist that focus on ceasing the broadcasting of specific forms of content. This may include content that has a specific moral standard or "non-mainstream" viewpoints. About 48 countries have taken legislative or administrative steps to regulate technology companies and the content that goes along with them. The regulations work to temperate the societal issues that occur online, such as harassment and extremism, to protect people from fraudulent activity and exploitative business practices (such as scams) and protect human rights.

A decrease in freedom of expression and anonymity on the Internet has been denounced in recent years, as governments and corporations have expanded efforts to track, monitor, flag, and sell information regarding Internet activity of users through systems such as HTTP cookies and social media analytics. Some of the laws regarding content admissibility are designed to suppress content that is relative to the government and harmful content towards users. The use of artificial intelligence (AI) technology and algorithms is in use to flag and remove inappropriate content, with possible abuses and algorithmic bias. Over the years, content regulation has been put in place to protect and promote human rights and digital rights, such as the European Union's General Data Protection Regulation which sets limits on the information collected by Internet giants and corporations for sale and use in analytics.

United States 
In 1934, the Communications Act worked to create the Federal Communications Commission (FCC) in the United States. The FCC is a federal agency that works to regulate interstate and foreign communications. They are given the power to make legal decisions and judgments about regulation content under the Communications Satellite Act of 1962, including the regulation of cable television operation, telegraph, telephone, two-way radio and radio operators, satellite communication and the internet. The FCC helps to maintain many areas regarding regulation which includes fair competition, media responsibility, public safety, and homeland security.

Content on the Internet is also monitored in the United States by federal law enforcement and intelligence agencies such as the CIA using the provisions of the Patriot Act among other acts of legislation, to profile interactions between users and content, and to restrict the production and dissemination of dissenting content such as whistleblowing information.

Content on the Internet is also monitored in the United States by federal law enforcement and intelligence agencies such as the CIA using the provisions of the Patriot Act among other acts of legislation, to profile interactions between users and content, and to restrict the production and dissemination of dissenting content such as whistleblowing information.

European Union 
The Digital Services Function (DSA) governs the responsibilities of digital services that act as mediators between customers and goods, services, and content. This comprises, for example, internet marketplaces.

To reduce hate crime and speech, the 2008 Framework Decision deemed that it is illegal to encourage and spread any form of hatred based on a person’s race, nationality, ethnicity, and religion. In addition, a Voluntary Code of Conduct was passed in 2016 to counter hate speech online.

European countries could also request a removal of content in other countries so long as they deemed it as a form of “terrorist” content

To control personal data of European citizens, the EU General Data Protection Regulation (GDPR) was passed on May 25th, 2018

On April 23, 2022, the European Parliament and Council established a political agreement on the new rules.

Indonesia 
Ministerial Regulation #5 (MR5) grants the Ministry of Communication and Information Technology the authority to compel any individual, business entity or community that operates “electronic systems” (ESOs) to restrict or remove any content deemed to be in violation of Indonesia’s laws within 24 hours. The breadth and open-ended nature of the regulation, implemented by the ministry in November 2020, can lead to censorship.

Myanmar 
The government drafted a law in February 2021 that would empower authorities to "order internet shutdowns, disrupt or block online services, ban service providers, intercept user accounts, access personal data of users and force the removal of any content on demand." The "cybersecurity law" was drafted after a military coup ousted Aung San Suu Kyi.

See also 
 Advertising
 Authoring
 Content adaptation
 Content designer
 Content farm
 Content format
 Content management
 Content management system
 Content writing services
 Enterprise content management
 Free content
 Geotargeting
 Media transparency
 Open content
 User-generated content
 Web content development
 Web content management system
 Digital Marketing

References

Publishing
Occupations